The All Blacks XV is the second national rugby union team of New Zealand, after the All Blacks. New Zealand's second national team has had numerous names in its history: Junior All Blacks, New Zealand XV, New Zealand A, New Zealand B, All Blacks XV.

Matches played as the 'All Blacks XV' are not test matches, usually against a touring side or when on tour, and against non-top tier rugby nations.

History
In 1991 a New Zealand XV played both Romania and USSR in the 'test' fixtures of their tours to New Zealand.

In 1991 a New Zealand B team played Australia B during their short tour.

In 1992 a New Zealand XV team beat England B in a pair of non-cap games during the tourists' 8-game tour.

In 1998 a New Zealand A team played the England touring side.

In 2005 a New Zealand A team played two matches against Australia A.

In 2006, the second team was re-branded as the Junior All Blacks, inheriting the nickname of the previous New Zealand U23 team. This second XV participated in the 2006, 2007 and 2009 Pacific Nations Cup. In 2008 the Maori All Blacks played in this tournament. The Junior All Blacks were put into a hiatus shortly after the 2009 tournament. The side was then reinstated in 2019, but their first set of games were delayed due to the COVID-19 pandemic.

In 2022 the team was re-branded once again as the All Blacks XV for matches against Ireland A and the Barbarians. 
 "The All Blacks XV was launched as NZR’s next senior national representative team after the All Blacks, as a critical high-performance pathway to the All Blacks. As the next senior national representative side, the All Blacks XV will have the same high expectations as the other Teams in Black ... The All Blacks XV follows in the footsteps of similar teams which have assembled throughout New Zealand rugby's history, including the Junior All Blacks, New Zealand A and Emerging Players."

Current squad 

The All Blacks XV squad

Junior All Blacks (NZ Juniors (U23s)) 
The NZ Juniors (U23s), popularly known as the Junior All Blacks, had been active from 1958 to 1984 playing 7 international matches. They were disbanded in 1984 and replaced by a non-age restricted team called the New Zealand Emerging Players. The Emerging Players were active in 1985 and 1986 but only played internal tours in fixtures against New Zealand provincial sides. In 2006, the team was formally reintroduced and repurposed as the second national team when they competed in the inaugural Pacific Nations Cup.

Junior All Blacks (U23s) results

See also

 New Zealand national schoolboy rugby union team
 New Zealand national under-19 rugby union team
 New Zealand national under-21 rugby union team
 Junior All Blacks
 Maori All Blacks
 All Blacks

References

Junior
Second national rugby union teams